Jesse N. "Buddy" Benson (November 9, 1933 – April 22, 2011) was an American football player and coach.

Benson played college football at the University of Oklahoma for one season (1952) under head coach Bud Wilkinson before transferring to the University of Arkansas for his final two years.

He served as the head football coach at a high school in Lewisville, Arkansas from 1956 to 1957 before embarking on a coaching career spanning four decades at Ouachita Baptist University in Arkadelphia, Arkansas.

References

External links
 Arkansas Sports Hall of Fame profile 

1933 births
2011 deaths
Arkansas Razorbacks football players
Oklahoma Sooners football players
Ouachita Baptist Tigers football coaches
High school football coaches in Arkansas
People from McCurtain County, Oklahoma
Players of American football from Oklahoma